The Texas A&M University School of Nursing in Bryan, Texas is a public college that is part of Texas A&M University. It was established in 2008 to address the critical nursing shortage in Texas.

History 
After receiving approval from the Texas Board of Nursing, the college began with 44 students in July 2008. Enrollment has since grown to approximately 450 students. The college of nursing is located in Bryan, Texas with clinical locations in Bryan-College Station, Round Rock, The Woodlands, and the Gulf Coast.

Academics 
The school offers three undergraduate degrees in nursing and three Masters of Science in specific fields of nursing.

The college currently has a 99% first time pass rate for the NCLEX-RN.

References

External links 
Texas A&M Health Science Center College of Nursing
https://nurse.org/articles/top-10-best-nursing-schools-texas/
https://today.tamu.edu/2017/05/08/texas-am-nursing-program-ranked-no-1-in-state/
https://www.usnews.com/best-graduate-schools/top-nursing-schools/texas-a-m-health-science-center-33681

Nursing
Nursing schools in Texas